The Neighbourhood and Worker's Service Centre (NWSC) is a pro-democracy political group in Hong Kong, holding one seat in the Legislative Council from 1995 to 1997, and since 1998. It was founded in 1985, with its roots in the New Youth Study Society founded in 1979. Politically it is identified as belonging to the pan-democracy camp. The sole member representing the NWSC in the Legislative Council is Leung Yiu-chung. It also holds three seats in the Kwai Tsing District Council.

History

Founding
The NWSC was founded in 1985 in the root of the New Youth Study Society in Tsuen Wan which was a social group formed by activist Lau Shan-ching and other graduates from the University of Hong Kong aiming at providing education for workers and raise their social consciousness. However, as the government set up night courses for adults in the early 1980s, the number of workers attended to the society's courses dropped. The lecturers and students in the society decided to participate in the newly established District Board elections as the government introduced constitutional reform.

Leung Yiu-chung, lecturer of the New Youth Study Society, led the Kwai Chung residents who were affected by concrete spalling and seepage in their public housing estates to demand solutions from the Housing Department. It later turned out to be a full-scale "26 blocks scandal". Leung was subsequently elected in the Kwai Chung Central constituency in the first District Board elections in 1985 and founded the Neighbourhood and Worker's Service Centre.

1980s to 1990s
In 1987 and 1988, the NWSC involved in the labour strikes in the Kwai Chung industrial area, including foreign electric companies such as Digital Equipment Corporation, Seiko and Philips.

In the 1988 District Board elections, Leung Yiu-chung and Tsui Pak-lam won seats in the Kwai Tsing District Council in the Kwai Fong and Kwai Hing constituencies.

The NWSC supported the Tiananmen Square protests of 1989 and joined the Hong Kong Alliance in Support of Patriotic Democratic Movements of China.

The NWSC nominated Leung Yiu-chung to run in the first Legislative Council direct elections in 1991 after a debate and voting. Running as an independent, Leung failed to be elected in the New Territories South constituency.

In the 1994 District Board elections, NWSC members Leung Yiu-chung, Tsui Pak-lam and Leung Chi-shing contested in the Kwai Wah, Kwai Fong and Kwai Hing constituencies, Leung Yiu-chung and Leung Chi-shing were elected.

Leung Yiu-chung was first elected to the Legislative Council in the 1995 elections through the newly created Textiles and Garment functional constituency under the then Governor Chris Patten's electoral reform.

The NWSC stood for the workers and grassroots interests in the LegCo. In 1996, Leung proposed an amendment to the Housing Ordinance to restrict the public housing rent could be increased only every three years and the median rent to income ratio could not exceed ten percent which was passed in late June 1997. Leung also moved a motion condemning the Preparatory Committee for the HKSAR as undemocratic. The NWSC boycotted the Beijing-controlled Provisional Legislative Council and protested against the Provisional Legislative Council repeals on the labour laws.

Following the transfer of the sovereignty of Hong Kong in 1997, Leung demanded a sentence for the young offenders who were detained "at Her Majesty's pleasure".

Leung Yiu-chung returned to the Legislative Council in the first Legislative Council elections in 1998 after the SAR established. Leung Yiu-chung became the only NWSC member in the Legislative Council since. Leung Yiu-chung and Leung Chi-shing were both re-elected in the following District Council elections in 1999.

2000s to present
In 2000 after the fire in Tai O, the NWSC helped the residents to demand for compensation and reconstruction. It also negotiated with the Hongkong and Yaumati Ferry to improve the frequency of service for the Tai O residents. Its services also extended to the new community in Tin Shui Wai.

The NWSC joined the WTO protests in 2005. Many NWSC were arrested afterwards. In 2006, the NWSC opposed the privatisation of the shopping centres and car parks of the Housing Department. The NWSC also supported the metal workers strike in 2007.

In November 2007, the NWSC retained three seats held by Leung Yiu-chung, Leung Chi-shing and Andrew Wan and also won a new seat with Wong Yun-tat in Kwai Chung Estate. Leung Wing-kun, who lost in the election and Andrew Wan left the NWSC in 2007 and 2008 respectively.

In 2009, the NWSC joined the alliance against the Guangzhou-Hong Kong Express Rail Link.

During the debate over the 2010 Hong Kong electoral reform, the NWSC opposed to both the "Five Constituency Referendum movement" triggered by the Civic Party and the League of Social Democrats and the revised proposals introduced by the Democratic Party and the Association for Democracy and People's Livelihood. The strategic conflicts within the pan-democracy camp resulted in a split between the factions. The NWSC remained fairly neutral.

In the 2016 Legislative Council election, NWSC veteran legislator Leung Yiu-chung switched his constituency from New Territories West to the territory-wide District Council (Second) constituency. Leung was elected with more than 300,000 votes but his protege Wong Yuen-tat failed to retain his seat in the New Territories West with only about 20,000 votes.

In June 2018, some 22 younger members in the NWSC including five members of the NWSC's eight-member executive board left the centre amid ideological differences with Leung Yiu-chung and Leung's decision to scrap the workers' committee due to financial woes, as Leung intended to fund his re-election in the next election in 2020. The exodus followed by two NWSC District Councillors, Wong Yun-tat, who was seen as Leung's most likely successor, and Leung Kam-wai to quit the centre in July, leaving NWSC with only two District Councillors.

Electoral performance

Legislative Council elections

District Council elections

References

1985 establishments in Hong Kong
Member organisations of the Civil Human Rights Front
Political organisations based in Hong Kong
Political organizations based in China
Political pressure groups of Hong Kong
Pro-democracy camp (Hong Kong)